Jaymee Joaquin (born as Jaymee Geronimo Topacio in San Juan, Metro Manila on July 27, 1984)  is a Filipina actress, model, and host. She made a career in the Philippines as a TV and print commercial model during her younger years and ventured in events promotion and hosting on the side.

After years of auditioning in the modeling scene, she became a part of ABS-CBN Star Magic, an artist management firm owned by ABSCBN Broadcasting Corporation. Joaquin landed supporting roles for movies, soap operas, sitcoms, and various TV programs.

But it was her hosting stint that started in 2006 as the game show anchor for the daily midnight show Games Uplate Live that gave her the recognition. She was known from her tagline "Kabagang!" Joaquin was nominated as "Best Game Show Host" for the PMPC Star Awards in 2007. She also hosted various live events and became the darling of local men's magazines. Jaymee was chosen as the September 2008 cover girl of Playboy Philippines. For 5 consecutive years (2006–2010), she was hailed one of the country's sexiest celebrities by FHM Philippines.

Jaymee left her showbiz career in 2010 to study a Communications & Tourism course in Sydney, Australia for almost 2 years. Then she lived in Madrid, Spain for 4 years to work as an English (as foreign language) teacher known as "Teacher Jaymee" from 2011 to 2015. She also did some commercial modeling on the side while exploring various cities in Europe. In mid-2015, she got based in San Diego, California involved in the hotel industry while working her way towards pursuing a career in media.

In October 2016, she got diagnosed with early stage breast cancer and did treatment in 2017 at the UCSD Moores Cancer Center in San Diego, California. She documents her life journey on social media with a blogger name "Jaymee Wins" to gain support, create awareness and bring inspiration to the general public. She had an early metastasis in 2018 and has been on preventative treatment since then. Jaymee is currently working her way to have a global voice and establish a brand as a social media influencer, on camera talent, media host and performing artist in America.

In January 2020 she released her podcast, WIN Your Daily Battles.

Filmography

TV shows
Bora - Peachy (2005)
Sharon - Segment Host (2006)
Showbiz No. 1 - Showbiz Field Reporter (2006)
Super Inggo 2: Ang Bagong Bangis - Bianca Bangkera a.k.a. Barrakuda (2007)
Games Uplate Live - Game Show Jock (2006–2008)
Ligaw na Bulaklak - Rita (2008)
Pare Koy - Beverly & Lyka Biscotti (2009)
Habang May Buhay - Nurse Shaira (2010)

Movies
Shake, Rattle and Roll 9 - Tatin (2007)
My Big Love - Gela (2008)
Walong Linggo - as herself (2008)
Tanging Ina Ninyong Lahat - Karina Devila (2008)

References

External links
 https://www.jaymeewins.com/
 http://teacherjaymee.blogspot.com Official Website

1984 births
Filipino television actresses
Filipino film actresses
Filipino television personalities
Star Magic
Living people
Actresses from Metro Manila
People from San Juan, Metro Manila
Social media influencers